Corent is a commune in the Puy-de-Dôme department in Auvergne-Rhône-Alpes in central France.

It sits approximately 2 miles north of Les Martres-de-Veyre on the side of the old volcanic Puy de Corent.

In 2001 excavation began on a Gallic (Celtic) and later Gallo-Roman Oppidum found in a field atop the puy. To this date, vast quantities of land have been excavated revealing the site as a main political, religious and economic center. Corent was an important fortified Celtic oppidum during the pre-Roman La Tène period (Late Iron Age), and there was already a dense fortified/walled settlement on the plateau during the Late Bronze Age Urnfield period.

Gallic oppidum

See also
Communes of the Puy-de-Dôme department

References

External links
3D reconstruction of Corent oppidum, France (La Tene period)

Former populated places in France
Communes of Puy-de-Dôme